Mojo is the ninth studio album by Australian blues musician Ash Grunwald. The album is Grunwald's first with new label Bloodlines Music, with whom he signed in 2019. The album was released on 30 August 2019 and peaked at number 40 on the ARIA Charts. Mojo was recorded in Los Angeles and in Australia and was produced by Brian Brinkerhoff, Carla Olson and Ash.

Upon release, Grunwald said "At this point, Mojo represents a journey through my own valley of darkness, and out the other side into the fresh sunlit glory of optimism and positivity. This may sound like a cliché, but when you've lived it it feels very different." adding "Mojo is a five year documentation of the twists and turns of a turbulent time in my life. It is my life's work up until this point".

Reception

Thom Devereux from Forte Magazine said "This album is one I would recommend to those who are familiar with Chicago blues and are looking for an album filled with vibrant, clean guitar solos that scream for minutes, and grungy, deeply distorted rhythm guitars. This album’s guest appearances add something different to each track, without straying too far from this style of music."

Jeff Jenkins from Stack Magazine said "The record showcases an all-star cast... but Grunwald's deep, soulful tone is the star of the show."

Mojo was produced by Brian Brinkerhoff, Carla Olson, George Carpenter and Ash Grunwald.

Track listing

Charts

Release history

References

2019 albums
Ash Grunwald albums